Bangladesh Freedom Fighters Welfare Trust or Muktijoddha Kalyan Trust, is government owned and operated trust in Bangladesh established to look after the interest of former Mukti Bahini members and others who fought for Bangladesh in the Bangladesh Liberation war and their family members. It is under the Ministry of Liberation War Affairs.

History 
It was established in September 1972. It owns a number of companies which generate include Tabani Beverage Company, Eastern Cables Industries Limited, Multiple Juice Concentrate Plant, Mimi Chocolate Limited, and Model Engineering Works. It owns four movie theatres: Gulistan, Naz, Moon, and Delwar Pictures. It also owns Gulistan Films Corporation and Durbar Advertising and Publications, Purnima Filling and Services Station. It also receives an annual 160 million taka from the government. 

According to the act which established the trust a freedom fighter is "person who served as a member of any force engaged in the war of liberation but shall not include the serving members of the defence services, police or the civil armed forces, or any government pensioner, or any other person having any regular source of income". The Government of Bangladesh in the 1970s handed over the management of tanneries to the trust and Bangladesh Chemical Industries Corporation.

In 1978, the government gave the trust a further 11 nationalised companies. The nationalisation of Moon Cinema Hall led to the Bangladesh Italian Marble Works Ltd. v. Government of Bangladesh, a ground breaking case which led to the Fifth Amendment to the Constitution of Bangladesh being declared illegal.

In 1983, the government of President Hussain Mohammad Ershad withdrew the trust from Bengal National Tannery, Bengal Tannery, Hamidia Metal Industries Limited, Hamidia Oil Mils, Jatrik Publications, Madina Ternary, and Omar Sons Structures Limited.

Between 1988 and 1989 it made a list of freedom fighters in Bangladesh. 

The Bangladesh Nationalist Party government from 1994 to 1995 closed down a number of companies of the trust; they are Hardeo Glass and Aluminum, Model Electric and Engineering Corporation, and United Tobacco Company. 

In 1999, the Awami League government Gulistan cinema hall and Naz cinema hall into shopping malls in a process marked by allegations of corruption. Shops in Rajdhani Super Market were rented out at very low prices by corrupt officials. Gulistan Shopping Complex was never finished.

Tabani Beverage Company is a bottler of Coca-Cola in Bangladesh. Coca-Cola stopped its agreement with Tabani over quality issues. The Awami League government closed Circo Soap and Chemical Industries in 2009.

In 2018, the trust closed down all of the industries it owned as corruption had made them unsustainable.

Industries 

 Mimi Chocolate Limited
 Tabani Bevarage Company Limited (bottled Coca-Cola)
 Bangladesh Glass Industries Limited
 Bengal National Tannery
 Baxley Paints
 Circo Soap and Chemical Industries
 Eastern Chemical Industries
 Eastern Cables Industries Limited
 Hamidia Metal Industries
 Horodeo Glass and Aluminum
 Model Electric and Engineering Works
 Multiple Juice Concentrate Plant
 National Tannery 
 United Tobacco Company Limited

References

1972 establishments in Bangladesh
Government agencies of Bangladesh
Organisations based in Dhaka
Aftermath of the Bangladesh Liberation War